The House of Representatives of Thailand of 2019 consists of 500 members elected in the 24 March 2019 general election, who, together with 250 members of the appointed Senate, form the National Assembly of Thailand. It is the first parliament convened in accordance with the 2017 constitution, which followed the 2014 military coup. Its lower house was the first since the coup to be elected, while the Senate was appointed by the National Council for Peace and Order, the military junta that came to power in the coup.

Parliament was officially opened by King Maha Vajiralongkorn on 24 May 2019. Former prime minister Chuan Leekpai was elected Speaker of the House of Representatives in its first session on 25 May. The National Assembly then convened on 5 June to vote for prime minister, in which incumbent prime minister and coup leader Prayut Chan-o-cha won over Future Forward Party leader Thanathorn Juangroongruangkit.

Members of the House of Representatives

Constituencies
The following table is a list of Thai MPs elected in the 2019 general election, ordered by constituency.

Party-list proportional representation 
The following is a table of Party-list MP's ordered by party from most to least popular votes.

Changes & by-elections

Constituencies

Party-list seats

References 

2019 in Thailand
House of Representatives of Thailand
2019 in Thai politics